South Trimble (April 13, 1864 – November 23, 1946) was a U.S. Representative from Kentucky. He was a prominent member of the famed South–Cockrell–Hargis family of Southern politicians.

Biography
Born near Hazel Green, Kentucky, to Asberry Trimble who was killed by his brother in law, Edward Hensley as he was putting his slaves to work at the Trimble Tannery during the American Civil War on October 15, 1864.   Trimble's mother bought and moved to a Franklin County, Kentucky home where he attended the public schools of Frankfort and Excelsior Institute.

He engaged in agricultural pursuits near Frankfort, Kentucky, including turkey farming. In 1913, Trimble became the second person to present a turkey to the President of the United States, hoping to break the 40-year monopoly that Horace Vose, the Westerly, Rhode Island turkey farmer who had provided the President's turkeys since 1873, had on the practice. Trimble was insistent that his turkeys, though smaller than Vose's, were more flavorful due to more red pepper in their diets. No record exists of whether or not Trimble or Vose won out, but Vose's death later in 1913 ensured a heated rivalry over the ensuing decades for the honors that was not settled until the National Turkey Federation took over in 1947.

He served as a member of the Kentucky House of Representatives 1898-1900, serving as Speaker in 1900.

Trimble was elected as a Democrat to the Fifty-seventh, Fifty-eighth, and Fifty-ninth Congresses (March 4, 1901 – March 3, 1907). He did not seek renomination in 1906, and was an unsuccessful Democratic candidate for Lieutenant Governor of Kentucky. He was Clerk of the United States House of Representatives, first, from April 4, 1911 to May 18, 1919.

He retired from public life and operated a plantation near Selma, Alabama.

He again served as Clerk of the House of Representatives from December 7, 1931, until his death in Washington, D.C., November 23, 1946. He was interred in Frankfort Cemetery, Frankfort, Kentucky.

References

External links

1864 births
1946 deaths
Burials at Frankfort Cemetery
Speakers of the Kentucky House of Representatives
Clerks of the United States House of Representatives
People from Wolfe County, Kentucky
Democratic Party members of the United States House of Representatives from Kentucky